WLLP-CA was a Class A television station that was licensed to and serving Lawrenceburg, Tennessee. This station is currently silent and will not return to the air because its license to broadcast has been canceled by the FCC in 2009. The station broadcast an analog signal on VHF channel 13.

The station also broadcast on a translator station on VHF channel 10 in Ethridge.

History 
The station was affiliated with the Total Living Network and AMGTV for most of its existence except for the first year, in which the station was independent. Before the station went dark permanently, at one point was a translator of WYLE-TV of Florence, Alabama, which also went defunct. Syndicated programming on WLLP included Animal Exploration with Jarod Miller, Real Life 101, and Ultimate Choice, all of which covered FCC-required children's educational programming.

References

External links

http://www.fcc.gov/fcc-bin/FMTV-service-area?x=CA1049673.html

Television stations in Tennessee
Defunct television stations in the United States
Television channels and stations established in 2005
Television channels and stations disestablished in 2009
2005 establishments in Tennessee
2009 disestablishments in Tennessee
LLP-CA